Whitefish salad is a salad of smoked freshwater whitefish and mayonnaise. Whitefish salad is a staple fare of Ashkenazi Jewish American cuisine, often found at appetizing stores and Jewish delicatessens. Common ingredients that can be added to whitefish salad include dill, lemon juice, capers, celery, chives, green peppers, vinegar, hard-boiled egg, and mustard. The mayonnaise can be substituted with sour cream, lebneh, or crème fraîche. Whitefish is often served on a bagel.

Whitefish salad is commonly served for Yom Kippur break fast and Hanukkah, as well as for sitting shivas, bar/bat mitzvahs, and other gatherings. Tablet Magazine founder Alana Newhouse included whitefish salad in her book "The 100 Most Jewish Foods." Food critic Mimi Sheraton recommends whitefish salad as a topping for toast or dark pumpernickel.

History
Whitefish salad originated in North America among Ashkenazi Jewish immigrants. Ashkenazi Jews discovered that the freshwater whitefish, found in the Great Lakes, was similar to freshwater whitefish found in Europe, and soon smoked freshwater whitefish became a staple of Ashkenazi Jewish appetizing stores and delicatessens and became an iconic example of Jewish American cuisine. Whitefish salad is a popular dish at breakfasts and morning celebrations, including brits and Sunday morning brunches.

See also

 Smoked fish
 Smoked sable
 List of smoked foods

References

Jewish American cuisine
Ashkenazi Jewish cuisine
Fish salads
Salmonidae
Smoked fish